Birmingham Aston was a constituency of the House of Commons of the Parliament of the United Kingdom. From 1918 to 1974 it elected one Member of Parliament (MP) by the first-past-the-post system of election.

History 
The constituency was created for the 1918 general election, when the boundaries of the city of Birmingham had been expanded.  One of the areas included in the city's expansion was the Aston area, which had formerly been part of Warwickshire. From 1885 to 1918, Aston Manor was a borough constituency in Warwickshire.

Boundaries
1918–1950: Parts of the County Borough of Birmingham wards of All Saints', Aston, Lozells, and St Mary's. The newly created seat was smaller and more the northern part of central Birmingham than Aston Manor had been.

1950–1955: The County Borough of Birmingham wards of Aston, Lozells, and St Paul's.

1955–1974: The County Borough of Birmingham wards of Aston, Gravelley Hill, and Stockland Green. The latter two wards had formerly been part of Birmingham Erdington. St Paul's ward became part of Birmingham Ladywood. Lozells ward was transferred to Birmingham Handsworth.

In the 1974 redistribution, this constituency disappeared. Aston ward became part of Birmingham Handsworth, while Gravelley Hill and Stockland Green wards became part of Birmingham Erdington.

Members of Parliament

Elections

Elections in the 1910s

Elections in the 1920s

Elections in the 1930s

Elections in the 1940s

Elections in the 1950s

Elections in the 1960s

Elections in the 1970s

See also
List of former United Kingdom Parliament constituencies

References

 Boundaries of Parliamentary Constituencies 1885-1972, compiled and edited by F.W.S. Craig (Parliamentary Reference Publications 1972)
 British Parliamentary Election Results 1918-1949, compiled and edited by F.W.S. Craig (Macmillan Press, revised edition 1977)
 British Parliamentary Election Results 1950-1973, compiled and edited by F.W.S. Craig (Parliamentary Research Services 1983)
 Who's Who of British Members of Parliament, Volume III 1919-1945, edited by M. Stenton and S. Lees (Harvester Press 1979)
 Who's Who of British Members of Parliament, Volume IV 1945-1979, edited by M. Stenton and S. Lees (Harvester Press 1981)

Parliamentary constituencies in Birmingham, West Midlands (historic)
Constituencies of the Parliament of the United Kingdom established in 1918
Constituencies of the Parliament of the United Kingdom disestablished in 1974